Hello, Are You There? is the second album from Voom, and their first for Lil' Chief Records. It was released in 2006.

Track listing
 "Beautiful Day" – 2:54
 "B Your Boy" – 3:15
 "Feel" – 2:18
 "Ride of Your Life" – 1:35
 "King Kong" – 3:15
 "Happy Just Bumming Around" – 2:30
 "Not Even a Dream" – 1:32
 "We're So Lost" – 2:40
 "Let's Go Home" – 1:38
 "I Want My Baby" - 4:45
 "Hello, Are You There?" - 2:55
 "No Real Reality" - 2:58
 "My Friend Satan" - 2:29
 "You Were a Man" - 2:27
 "I'm Leaving Forever" - 1:44
 "I Went to Sleep" - 1:35

External links
 Voom website
 Voom's MySpace page
 Lil' Chief Records: Voom
 Lil' Chief Records

2006 albums
Voom (band) albums
Lil' Chief Records albums